The Naga-Manipuri-Chin hills moist forests is an ecoregion of India, Bangladesh, and Myanmar, designated by the World Wide Fund for Nature as one of the world's outstanding Global 200 ecoregions.

The Global 200 ecoregion includes several ecoregions:
Northern Triangle subtropical forests
Mizoram–Manipur–Kachin rain forests
Chin Hills–Arakan Yoma montane forests
Meghalaya subtropical forests
Northeast India–Myanmar pine forests

External links
Naga-Manupuri-Chin Hills Moist Forests: a Global 200 Ecoregion (World Wide Fund for Nature)

Indomalayan realm